Great Dawley is a civil parish in the district of Telford and Wrekin, Shropshire, England.  It contains seven listed buildings that are recorded in the National Heritage List for England.  Of these, one is at Grade II*, the middle of the three grades, and the others are at Grade II, the lowest grade.  The parish contains the town of Dawley, and all the listed buildings are in the town and its suburb of Malinslee; these consist of two churches, shops, a house, a public house and a memorial in the form of a drinking fountain.


Key

Buildings

References

Citations

Sources

Lists of buildings and structures in Shropshire